Sogle is a village in the municipality of Čaška, North Macedonia.

Demographics

The village of Sogle contains a Macedonian Muslim (Torbeš) population and Muslim Albanians. In the early 1960s the Muslim Macedonian population consisted of 7 families and 11 households, while Muslim Albanians were 13 families and 24 households. Due to the migration of some of the Muslim population from the village, Orthodox Macedonians from the villages of Nežilovo, Papradište, Oreše, Bogomila and other settlements of the Azot region have settled in their place in Sogle. Muslim Albanians though traditionally have been a smaller population in Sogle, they have influenced the process of Muslim Macedonians in the village assimilating as Albanians. Village relations between Albanians of Sogle with those of Gorno Jabolčište and Dolno Jabolčište are absent and instead are close with the villages of Desovo and Crnilište with whom they practice marriage endogamy.

According to the 2021 census, the village had a total of 116 inhabitants. Ethnic groups in the village include:

Macedonians 70
Albanians 41
Others 5

References

Villages in Čaška Municipality
Macedonian Muslim villages
Albanian communities in North Macedonia